Storey (formerly, Madera Station) is an unincorporated community in Madera County, California, United States.

The area was named after William Benson Storey, the former president of the ATSF. The former Storey Train Station (used by ATSF, and subsequently by Amtrak), was located in Storey, but Amtrak always referred to the station as Madera. The station was permanently closed after Amtrak moved its service to the new Madera station in November 2010. Within a few years thereafter, the station's side platform uncovered the waiting area, and parking lot were entirely removed, leaving little evidence of the former station.

References

Unincorporated communities in California
Unincorporated communities in Madera County, California